Cibuta is a  town in the Mexican state of Sonora.
The name is native and means “feather head dress” in the Tohono O’odham language the original inhabitants of the area. See the publication Trails to Tiburón The 1894 and 1895 Field Diaries of W J McGee

Established in the 19th century, it has been a related but separate entity with the City of Nogales to its north.  It has its own law enforcement, president and cabinet.  The Dicochea family has ranches surrounding it on all its sides and have been the ongoing presidents for decades since its inception.

The last two presidents have served over 35 years combined.

In succession, the presidents have been Angel Antonio Dicochea for 20+ years and now it is run by his brother Leonardo Dicochea.
Next in line should be Angel's only son Carlos Antonio Dicochea who should assume the presidency in the next few years.

References

Populated places in Sonora